This is a list of Eliteserien players who have made 300 or more appearances in the Eliteserien. Statistics are updated as of 21 August 2022. Current Eliteserien players are shown in bold.

References

Eliteserien players
players
Association football player non-biographical articles